Sherouk Sayed Abdou Farhan (born 26 November 1999) is an Egyptian footballer who plays as a midfielder for Romanian club FCU Olimpia Cluj and the Egyptian national team. She participated with the Egyptian women's national football team in the 2016 African Nations Cup. She also played for Wadi Degla Club.

Club career 
Farhan plays for Egyptian Women's Premier League club Wadi Degla.

International career 
In 2016, at the age of 16, Farhan was promoted to the senior team and made the 21 woman squad for 2016 African Nations Cup hosted by Cameroon.

References

External links 
 
 

1999 births
Living people
Egyptian women's footballers
Women's association football midfielders
Wadi Degla SC players
FCU Olimpia Cluj players
Egypt women's international footballers
Egyptian expatriate footballers
Egyptian expatriate sportspeople in Romania
Expatriate women's footballers in Romania